UAAP Season 64 is the 2001–02 athletic year of the University Athletic Association of the Philippines, which was hosted by the Far Eastern University.

Basketball

Elimination round

Bracket

Overall championship race

Juniors' division

Seniors' division

Broadcast notes
The UAAP games is televised on Studio 23 brought you by ABS-CBN Sports. The Metropolitan Basketball Association was aired on People's Television Network (later renamed National Broadcasting Network) produced in the same sports division during other basketball games. Mico Halili, Jude Turcuato, Sev Sarmenta, Bill Velasco, and Bob Novales were presenters, Danny Francisco, Randy Sacdalan and others color commentators.

See also
NCAA Season 77

External links 
 Musikitchen Entertainment Phils. - 64th UAAP OPENING, 2001
 UBelt.com - UAAP Season 64 - Final Overall Championship Tally
 WebArchive - Atenista.Net - UAAP 64

 
2001 in Philippine sport
64